John Setear (born 1959) is a professor of International Law at the University of Virginia School of Law. Setear also teaches courses in Contracts, Rules, Counterfactual History, the Civil War, the Cold War, and Baseball.

Education 
Setear is a graduate of Williams College and Yale Law School.

Career 
After law school, Setear served as a law clerk for Judge Carl E. McGowan of the United States Court of Appeals for the District of Columbia Circuit (1984-1985). He then clerked on the United States Supreme Court for Justice Sandra Day O'Connor (1985-1986). Setear worked at the RAND Corporation in the early 1990s, where his work focused on the use of war games and military simulations in defense analysis. His areas of scholarly interest include Foreign Relations Law, international whaling, and international climate agreements.

See also 
List of law clerks of the Supreme Court of the United States (Seat 8)

References

1959 births
Living people
RAND Corporation people
University of Virginia School of Law faculty
Williams College alumni
Yale Law School alumni
Law clerks of the Supreme Court of the United States